Egon Balas (June 7, 1922 in Cluj, Romania – March 18, 2019) was an applied mathematician and a professor of industrial administration and applied mathematics at Carnegie Mellon University. He was the Thomas Lord Professor of Operations Research at Carnegie Mellon's Tepper School of Business and did fundamental work in developing integer and disjunctive programming.

Life and education 
Balas was born in Cluj (Romania) in a Hungarian Jewish family. His original name was Blatt, which was first changed to the Hungarian Balázs and then later to the Romanian Balaş. He was married to art historian Edith Balas, a survivor of Auschwitz, with whom he had two daughters. He was imprisoned by the Communist authorities for several years after the war.

He left Romania in 1966 and accepted an appointment with Carnegie Mellon University in 1967. Balas obtained a "Diploma Licentiate" in economics (Bolyai University, 1949) and Ph.D.s in economics (University of Brussels, 1967) and mathematics (University of Paris, 1968). 
His mathematics PhD thesis was titled Minimax et dualité en programmation discrète and was written under the direction of Robert Fortet.

Selected publications
E. Balas, A. Saxena: Optimizing Over the Split Closure, Mathematical Programming 113, 2 (2008), 219–240.
E. Balas, M. Perregaard: A Precise Correspondence Between Lift-and-Project Cuts, Simple Disjunctive Cuts, and Mixed Integer Gomory Cuts for 0-1 Programming, Mathematical Programming B (94), 2003; 221–245.
E. Balas, S. Ceria, G. Cornuéjols: Mixed 0-1 Programming by Lift-and-Project in a Branch-and-Cut Framework,  Management Science 42, 1996; 1229–1246.
E. Balas: The Prize Collecting Traveling Salesman Problem: II Polyhedral Results, Networks 25, 1995; 199–216. 
E. Balas, S. Ceria, G. Cornuéjols: A Lift-and-Project Cutting Plane Algorithm for Mixed 0-1 Programs, Mathematical Programming 58, 1993; 295–324.
E. Balas: The Prize Collecting Traveling Salesman Problem I, Networks 19, 1989; 621–636.
E. Balas, J. Adams, D. Zawack: The Shifting Bottleneck Procedure for Job Shop Scheduling, Management Science 34, 1988; 391–401. 
E. Balas, V. Chvátal, J. Nesetril: On The Maximum-Weight Clique Problem,  Mathematics of Operations Research 12, 1987; 522–536.
E. Balas: Disjunctive Programming, Annals of Discrete Mathematics 5, 1979; 3–51.
E. Balas: An Additive Algorithm for Linear Programming in Zero-One Variables, Operations Research 13 (4), 1965; 517–546.

Honors and awards
 National Academy of Engineering, 2006
 IFORS Hall of Fame, 2006
 Honorary Doctorate in Mathematics, University of Waterloo, 2005
 Hungarian Academy of Science, external member, 2004
 INFORMS Fellow, 2002
 Honorary Doctorate in Mathematics, Miguel Hernandez University, Elche, Spain, 2002
 EURO Gold Medal, 2001
 John von Neumann Theory Prize, INFORMS, 1995
 Senior U.S. Scientist Award of the von Humboldt Foundation, 1980–1981

Notes

References
 E. Balas: Will to Freedom: A Perilous Journey through Fascism and Communism (Syracuse University Press, 2000) (translated in Hungarian, Romanian, French, Italian, and German).
 E. Balas: Some Thoughts on the Development of Integer Programming During My Research Career, European Journal of Operational Research, 2002, 141 (1) pp. 1–7.

Further reading
 Graham K. Rand: Egon Balas, Profiles in Operations Research (eds.: A.A. Asad, S.L. Gass), International Series in Operations Research and Management Science, 147, Springer, 2011.

External links 
 
 Biography of Egon Balas from the Institute for Operations Research and the Management Sciences

1922 births
2019 deaths
20th-century Hungarian mathematicians
Carnegie Mellon University faculty
Members of the United States National Academy of Engineering
John von Neumann Theory Prize winners
Fellows of the Institute for Operations Research and the Management Sciences
Scientists from Cluj-Napoca
20th-century Romanian mathematicians
Romanian emigrants to the United States
Babeș-Bolyai University alumni
Free University of Brussels (1834–1969) alumni